Ultimate Party 2020 was a professional wrestling event produced by CyberFight's DDT Pro-Wrestling (DDT). The event took place on November 3, 2020, in Tokyo at the Ota City General Gymnasium. It was the second event under the Ultimate Party chronology. The event aired live on AbemaTV and on DDT's streaming service Wrestle Universe.

Storylines
The show featured ten matches that resulted from scripted storylines, where wrestlers portray heroes, villains, or less distinguishable characters in scripted events that build tension and culminate in a wrestling match or series of matches.

On August 23, 2020, Tetsuya Endo won the annual King of DDT tournament by defeating T-Hawk in the finals. Usually, the winner of the tournament would receive a shot at the KO-D Openweight Championship, but since Endo was already holding the title, he was allowed to choose his challenger. Endo initially named Kenny Omega, a former DDT full-time member, but due to the COVID-19 pandemic, travel restrictions prevented the match from happening. At Get Alive 2020, Endo chose his Damnation stablemate Daisuke Sasaki to be his challenger instead. On September 27, at Who's Gonna Top? 2020, Sasaki hit Endo with a low blow and ordered the rest of Damnation and #StrongHearts to beat Endo up. They refused and attacked Sasaki instead before announcing he was being kicked out of the unit. In a following interview, Sasaki refused to acknowledge his eviction and promised that he would leave DDT if he failed to defeat Endo. On October 3, at "This Will Be Our Third Narimasu Event! 2020", a handicap match pitting Sasaki against the team of Endo and T-Hawk ended in a disqualification when Damnation interfered in order to attack Sasaki. Hiroshi Yamato came to Sasaki's rescue and the match was restarted as a regular tag team match that Yamato and Sasaki were unable to win.

In February, Chris Brookes became the inaugural DDT Universal Champion, a title created to attract an international viewership to DDT's programming. By June, he was already a two-time champion, and after defending his title against Naomi Yoshimura on October 10, at DDT TV Show! #9, he called his opponent weak. Unhappy about the insult, Yoshimura's tag team partner Yuki Ueno came out to challenge Brookes to a title match. Days later, at a press conference, Brookes presented Ueno with flowers as if he was already mourning Ueno's KO-D Tag Team Championship title loss and the end of his tag team as Yoshimura was scheduled to take a medical leave of absence following the Ultimate Party event.

Results

Four-way elimination match

References

External links
The official DDT Pro-Wrestling website

DDT Ultimate Party
2020 in professional wrestling
November 2020 events in Japan
Professional wrestling in Tokyo
2020 in Tokyo
Events in Tokyo